The 1927 Providence Steam Roller season was their third in the league. The team improved on their previous season's output of 5–7–1, winning eight games. They finished fifth in the league.

Schedule

Standings

References

Providence Steam Roller seasons
Providence Steam Roller